Robert Russ (1847 – 1922), was an Austrian painter.

Biography
He was born in Vienna and was active in the Netherlands during the years 1880–1910. He is known as an illustrator as well as a painter, mostly of landscapes.

He died in Vienna.

References

 
Robert Russ on Artnet

1847 births
1922 deaths
Artists from Vienna
19th-century Austrian painters
19th-century Austrian male artists
Austrian male painters
20th-century Austrian painters
20th-century Austrian male artists